Evan Hoyt (born 16 January 1995) is a Mexican-born British tennis player.

Hoyt has a career high ATP singles ranking of world No. 319, achieved on 16 September 2019. In doubles, he peaked at No. 217 on 12 August 2019.

Hoyt has won one ATP Challenger doubles title at the 2018 Canberra Tennis International.

ATP Challengers and ITF Futures finals

Singles: 10 (6–4)

Doubles: 31 (19–12)

External links
 
 

1995 births
Living people
British male tennis players
Sportspeople from Torreón
Sportspeople from Llanelli
Mexican emigrants to the United Kingdom
Welsh male tennis players
Mexican male tennis players